The R682 road is a regional road in County Waterford, Ireland. It travels from the R680 road to the R675, connecting the N25 road with Tramore.

References

Regional roads in the Republic of Ireland
Roads in County Waterford